Messestadt-West is a Munich U-Bahn station on line  U2.

Overview 

The station was opened on 29 May 1999 and is situated in the Messestadt Riem of which he covers the western part. It is situated below the Willy-Brandt-Allee. There are 9 light domes in the middle of the road.
The walls and the ceiling are made of light red colored concrete.
The station is illuminated by 2 rows of neon tubes, the light domes and by the mezzanine.
The floor is covered by granite slabs and thus reflects the light.
At the northern mezzanine there is the Messesee. The western entrance of the Messe München is accessible from here.
At the southern end of the station there is also a mezzanine. From here you can get to the Willy-Brandt-Allee. The codenames of the station were Riem West and Neu-Riem West.

Stations

References

External links 
 More information

Munich U-Bahn stations
Railway stations in Germany opened in 1999